Children's Hospital Oakland Research Institute (CHORI) is a biomedical research institute affiliated with California’s pediatric medical center, UCSF Benioff Children's Hospital Oakland.

CHORI is based in Oakland, California, and operates a  biomedical research facility that houses 300 staff members. It includes eight research centers that conduct focused research on cancer, critical care medicine, genetics, immunobiology and vaccine development, blood and marrow transplantation and cellular therapies, nutrition and metabolism, prevention of obesity, cardiovascular disease and diabetes, sickle cell disease and thalassemia.

The National Institutes of Health is CHORI's primary funding source.

Research Centers 
 Center for Cancer
 Center for Critical Care Medicine
 Center for Genetics
 Center for Immunobiology & Vaccine Development
 The Jordan Family Center for Blood and Marrow Transplantation and Cellular Therapies Research
 Center for Nutrition & Metabolism
 Center for Prevention of Obesity, Cardiovascular Disease & Diabetes
 Center for Sickle Cell Disease & Thalassemia

Research Services 
 BACPAC Resource Center
 Cell Sorting
 Elemental Analysis
 Genetic Testing
 Mass Spectrometry
 Microscope Imaging
 Molecular Diagnostics
 Sibling Donor Cord Blood

Research Applications 
CHORI’s translational research applications include providing cures for blood diseases, developing new vaccines for infectious diseases, and discovering new treatment protocols for previously fatal or debilitating conditions such as cancers, sickle cell disease and thalassemia, diabetes, asthma, HIV/AIDS, pediatric obesity, nutritional deficiencies, birth defects, hemophilia and cystic fibrosis. CHORI is also a teaching institute  with educational programs for high school, college, doctoral and post-doctoral students.

Research Achievements 
CHORI is the first research institute in North America to transplant and cure a child with alpha thalassemia major, is a leading center for the use of cord blood and bone marrow transplantation in children with sickle cell anemia and thalassemia, and offers the only not-for-profit Sibling Donor Cord Blood Program in the world. The Research Institute’s recombinant DNA library contains over 20 million DNA samples that are used in research programs around the world.

History 
CHORI began in 1959 with a small group of scientists and initial financial support from Children’s Hospital Oakland and the family of Lt. Bruce Lyon. Founded as the Bruce Lyon Memorial Research Laboratory (BLMRL), it was the first research laboratory in Northern California dedicated exclusively to children’s diseases.
BLMRL was renamed “CHORI,” the research branch of the newly named Children's Hospital & Research Center Oakland, in 1986. In 1999, CHORI moved to the former University High School campus, where it is currently located.

References

External links 
 Official site
 Children's Hospital & Research Center Foundation

Healthcare in Oakland, California
Research and development in the United States
Research institutes in the San Francisco Bay Area
Pediatrics in the United States
Gene banks